Poustseno  Macedonian language Пуштено", Pushteno, meaning "to let go" is a traditional Macedonian  dance from Florina, Western Macedonia Greece. It is danced in the area of Florina by the native (Greek) Macedonians, and is also known with the Greek name of "Lytos".

See also
Music of Greece
Greek dances

References
Ελληνικοί παραδοσιακοί χοροί - Πουστσένο

Greek dances
Macedonia (Greece)
Macedonian music
Macedonian dances